Marie-Chantal Depetris-Demaille (born 17 December 1941) is a French foil fencer. She competed at the 1964, 1968 and 1972 Summer Olympics.

References

External links
 

1941 births
Living people
French female foil fencers
Olympic fencers of France
Fencers at the 1964 Summer Olympics
Fencers at the 1968 Summer Olympics
Fencers at the 1972 Summer Olympics
Sportspeople from Orne